Lost Lake is a lake located, in the town of St. Germain, in Vilas County, Wisconsin, United States. Visitors have access to the lake from a public boat landing. Fish include Musky, Panfish, Largemouth Bass, Northern Pike and Walleye.

Notes

Lakes of Wisconsin
Lakes of Vilas County, Wisconsin